Atorella is a genus of crown jellyfish. It is the only genus in the monotypic family Atorellidae and includes five species. Members of this family are known from the eastern coast of Africa and the western coast of Panama.

Characteristics
Members of this genus are characterised by having exactly six tentacles and six rhopalia, twelve marginal lappets and twelve pedalia. The bell is colourless and transparent and the four orange gonads can be seen inside. The mouth has four lips.

Species
The World Register of Marine Species lists the following species:-

Atorella arcturi Bigelow, 1928
Atorella japonica Kawaguti & Matsuno, 1981
Atorella octogonus Mills, Larson & Young, 1987
Atorella subglobosa Vanhöffen, 1902
Atorella vanhoeffeni Bigelow, 1909

References

Coronatae
Scyphozoan genera